Banana production in Honduras plays an important role in the economy of Honduras. In 1992, the revenue generated from banana sales amounted to US$287 million and along with the coffee industry accounted for some 50% of exports. Honduras produced 861,000 tons of bananas in 1999. The two corporations, Chiquita Brands International and the Dole Food Company are responsible for most Honduran banana production and exports.

History 
Honduras began exporting bananas in the late nineteenth century, and the trade grew rapidly.  Initially, in the 1870s most banana production was confined to the Bay Islands, serious production did not begin on the mainland until about 1880. The US consul reported that in 1894 goods worth almost $350,000 were exported to the United States through Puerto Cortés, the region's main port, and by 1903 exports had almost tripled to over $900,000.  Much of these exports came from the growing banana trade; between 1894 and 1903 the trade had grown almost four-fold from somewhat over 600,000 stems to over two million. Shipping capacity increased as well, from four steamers a month to the United States, to 18. The choice of US destination ports expanded from just New Orleans to include Mobile, Philadelphia and Boston.

The initial growth in trade was from local banana growers. An 1899 census showed northern Honduras had some 1,000+ people in the region between Puerto Cortés and La Ceiba (and as far inland as San Pedro Sula) growing bananas, most of them on small holdings.  This numerous class was able to expand production, take over communal lands and win the political struggle with cattle ranchers over land control in the early decades of the twentieth century.

In the early years of the industry, banana growers delivered their fruit to the coast where steamers from a variety of US-based shippers purchased them. However, the steamship companies gradually merged until only a handful remained, and these were soon dominated by the Vaccaro brothers of New Orleans, who in 1899 founded the Standard Fruit and Steamship Company which eventually became Dole. Because northern Honduras had a poorly developed transportation network, only farms located along major streams, and the few existing railroads in the immediate vicinity of the coast could viably participate in the export trade. Thus, the steamship companies needed to invest in a local infrastructure of railroads that would expand the area available for cultivation. By 1902 local railroad lines were being constructed on the Caribbean coast to accommodate expanding banana production.

The Honduran government, operating on Liberal economic policies that had been in place since 1876, made significant concessions of land and tax exemption to anyone who would open up agricultural land. While some Honduran producers were able to take advantage of these opportunities, the most significant concessions went to US-based companies that had the capital to purchase and develop land quickly.  Companies like the Tela Railroad Company were granted land concessions in exchange for building railroad lines. In its 1912 concession, the Tela Railroad Company received 6,000 hectares of national land (that is land that was deemed vacant) for every 12 kilometers of track they laid, on the route from Tela to El Progresso, laid out in alternate blocks on both sides of the rail lines.

After the first concessions in 1912, US concerns achieved more or less complete control of the productive alluvial plains of Honduras' Atlantic coast. The area around Puerto Cortés was dominated by the Cuyamel Fruit Company, the La Ceiba region by Standard Fruit, and Tela and Trujillo were controlled by United Fruit's subsidiaries, the Tela Railroad Company and the Trujillo Railroad Company.

Initially, Honduran producers focused on growing the Gros Michel type of bananas, which had important characteristics that made them easy to store and ship and appealed to consumers in North American markets. However in the early 1920s banana-producing areas began suffering from a blight known as the "Panama Disease" which, combined with soil exhaustion from monocrop agriculture, led to a production decline in many parts of northern Honduras. The companies sought to restore production by rerouting railroads and renegotiating concessions so to bring more virgin land into cultivation. In addition they began to replace the Gros Michel with the Cavendish variety, which had some resistance to the disease.

Political Implications
General Sierra's efforts to perpetuate himself in office led to his overthrow in 1903 by General Manuel Bonilla, who proved to be an even greater ally of the banana companies than Sierra had been. Companies gained exemptions from taxes and permission to construct wharves and roads, as well as permission to improve interior waterways and to obtain charters for new railroad construction. 

At one time the American government trained the Honduran army and air force to protect the supremacy of the banana companies operating in the country. The growth of banana production in Honduras soon saw the industry constituting some 88% of Honduran exports at its all-time peak, centering the economic activity of the country almost entirely on the Atlantic coast region, with the economic center at the coastal city of San Pedro Sula rather than Tegucigalpa. 

The Honduran banana industry employed a significant Garifuna workforce from the Bay Islands off Trujillo and in 1901 the government gave concessions for them to use over 7,000 hectares for banana cultivation. However in practice it was impossible to protect all of this land for its given purpose and corruption saw a local military commander in Trujillo, Colonel Gustavo Alvarez, squander 2,000 hectares of land allocated to the Garifuna and give the land to the wealthy landowners. 

In 1964, Castle & Cooke bought out the Standard Fruit Company, and concentrated on the production of bananas and pineapples under the Dole label in Honduras.  In September 1974, Hurricane Fifi devastated some 60% of Honduras' agricultural production, and many of the plantations had to be abandoned, seriously affecting the economy. In response, the redundant plantation workers formed the Las Isletas Peasants Enterprise, where they harvested the bananas independently and reaped the profits, producing one million boxes of bananas in 1976 and four million in 1977. Las Isletas attempted to sell the fruit directly through the Union of Banana Exporting Countries at one stage, resulting in the arrest of 200 militant members of Las Isletas and a raid on the association's headquarters under pressure from the Standard Fruit Company, who feared being outlawed by the process.

In the mid-1990s, the Honduran economy went into severe recession, which hit the banana and coffee industries hard and sending world prices soaring.
Although the economy recovered significantly in 1996, the banana industry in Honduras was struck hard by the lasting impression of Hurricane Mitch in late 1998, a Category Five Hurricane  considered the worst in 200 years, with winds reaching  and inundating land with excessive precipitation drowning many of the crops. Hurricane Mitch is believed to have destroyed over 50%, possibly as high as 80%, of the banana and coffee crops in 1998, costing an estimated $3 billion in damage. 

Since 2000 the industry has recovered, although the country is still one of the poorest in Central America.

In 2003, the New Scientist reported that global banana production was under threat by disease and may be wiped out within ten years if preventative measures are not taken to protect against it. Scientists from the banana industry in Honduras responded to the potential crisis by implementing new large-scale breeding schemes in a new FHIA variety. This FHIA banana crop is resistant to major diseases and pests, but is also highly productive and efficient. The scheme in Honduras is financed by the multinational United Brands.

References

Works cited 

 
 
 
 

Agriculture in Honduras
Banana production